The A3 is a national road in Latvia connecting Inčukalns to Estonian border in Valka. The road is part of European route E264, and part of TEN-T road network of Latvia. After the border, the road turns into Estonian National Highway 3, which leads to Jõhvi in northeastern Estonia. The length of A3 in Latvian territory is 122 kilometers. The road leads through the scenic Gauja National Park. Currently A3 has 1x2 lanes in full length. A3 bypasses Valmiera, which is one of the biggest cities in Latvia. There aren't any plans to widen it in near future. Almost half of A3 was reconstructed in 2012. Speed limit is 90 km/h. The average AADT on A3 in 2015 was 5317 cars per day.

Crossings

Major cities crossed
Inčukalns
Ragana
Stalbe
Kocēni
Valmiera
Strenči
Valka

References

External links
Autoceļš A3 in Google Maps

A03